HMS Statesman was an S-class submarine of the Royal Navy, and part of the Third Group built of that class. She was built by Cammell Laird and launched on 14 September 1943.  So far she has been the only ship of the Royal Navy to bear the name Statesman.

Career

She spent the time between August 1944 and August 1945 with the Eastern Fleet, where she had an eventful career. She sank the Japanese army cargo ship Sugi Maru No.5 (the former Panamanian-flagged, Norwegian-owned Gran), twenty-five Japanese sailing vessels, the Japanese trawler Matsujima Maru No.3, four Japanese coasters, including Nippon Maru No.19, Nanyo Maru No. 17 and Nippon Maru No.14, a small Japanese tanker, five small unidentified Japanese vessels, ten small Japanese landing craft, three Japanese barges and a derelict wreck drifting in the Straits of Malacca, described as probably a coaster.

Sinking of Haguro

On 9 May 1945 the Japanese heavy cruiser Haguro and the  left Singapore for a transport run to the Andaman Islands. They were sighted the next day in the Malacca Strait by Statesman and her sister, . To intercept the Japanese ships, a task force made up of two battleships, one heavy cruiser, two light cruisers, four escort carriers and eight destroyers left Trincomalee. Aircraft from the escort carriers attacked the Nicobar Islands on 11 May, forcing Haguro and Kamikaze to head back to Singapore.

On 14 May the Japanese ships again departed Singapore for the Andaman Islands. They were spotted the next day northeast of Sabang by aircraft from the British escort carrier . A few hours later they were attacked by aircraft from the British escort carrier , causing light damage to Haguro. In the meantime Japanese aircraft had sighted Allied destroyers closing in on Haguro and once again the Japanese ships reversed course.

After careful manoeuvering the destroyers began attacking the Japanese ships from all sides shortly after one o'clock the following day. Haguro was hit by torpedoes and gunfire and sank around 0230 hours, but not before she hit Saumarez with gunfire. The escorting Japanese destroyer Kamikaze escaped with only minor damage. It was during this operation that HMS Statesman put into Pangkor Laut, a small island in the Malacca Strait to retrieve Lt Col. Spencer Chapman, a British Army officer who had been operating behind Japanese lines since the invasion in 1942.

Postwar

She survived the Second World War and was lent to the French Navy in 1952 who renamed her Sultane. She was returned on 5 November 1959 and was sold on 3 January 1961 to Pounds, of Portsmouth to be broken up. However, large parts of the vessel, including the conning tower, remained intact and these have since been restored and preserved as part of a private collection at Fort Southwick, Portsmouth.

References

 

British S-class submarines (1931)
Ships built on the River Mersey
1943 ships
World War II submarines of the United Kingdom
Saphir-class submarines (1951)
Royal Navy ship names